100 Things to Do Before High School is an American comedy television series created by Scott Fellows that aired on Nickelodeon from November 11, 2014 to February 27, 2016. The series stars Isabela Moner, Jaheem King Toombs, Owen Joyner, and Jack De Sena.

Premise 
Three childhood best friends set off on a quest to make the best out of their final two years of middle school by making a list of 100 things to achieve before they set off to high school. Along with the list and help from their guidance counselor, they make it through the highs and the lows of middle school.

Cast and characters

Main 
 Isabela Moner as CJ Martin, an optimistic 12-year-old who believed that high school would be the best years of her and her best friends' lives until her brother tells her the truth: she will lose all of her friends before high school due to them liking different things. To prevent this from happening, she creates a bucket list filled with things to accomplish before high school.
 Jaheem King Toombs as Fenwick Frazier, a seventh grader who became CJ's first friend in kindergarten. He thinks he is the smartest student in the entire school and tends to be reluctant to CJ's ideas. However, he is loyal, and is prone to adventure.
 Owen Joyner as Christian "Crispo" Powers, a 12-year-old boy who vowed to be CJ's best friend after she saved him from choking on his stuffed horse in kindergarten. In sixth grade, he had a bad haircut and braces, but got them off prior to the events of the series' first episode. He became the coolest boy in the whole school, causing the most popular girl in the school to constantly try to get his affections, which becomes a running gag in the series. Nevertheless, he is also loyal, and while he does not have much common sense, his heart is in the right place, and he just wants to have fun with his two best friends as much as he can.
 Jack De Sena as Jack Roberts, the school's guidance counselor, who often helps the three with their list and gives them advice. He often finds loopholes to help CJ.

Recurring 
 Max Ehrich as Ronbie Martin, CJ's older brother, who is in high school. He told her the truth about high school and is usually seen studying.
 Stephanie Escajeda as Mrs. Martin, CJ and Ronbie's mother.
 Henry Dittman as Mr. Martin, CJ and Ronbie's father.
 Lisa Arch as Principal Hader, the school's new principal, who was hired prior to the first episode's events.
 Brady Reiter as Mindy Minus, the most popular girl in school, who is in the same grade as CJ, Fenwick, and Crispo. She often schemes to get Crispo to be her boyfriend, but often fails. She is considered to be mean, spoiled, snobby, and possessive.
 Christopher Neiman as Henry Slinko, the school's science teacher.

Production 
The series first aired November 11, 2014, with an hour-long pilot. The series began its regular schedule on June 6, 2015, with the third episode, after the second episode aired on May 30, 2015, as a "sneak preview". On September 11, 2016, actress Lisa Arch stated on Twitter that the series was canceled by Nickelodeon.

Episodes

Series overview

Special (2014)

Season 1 (2015–16)

Broadcast 
100 Things to Do Before High School premiered on Nickelodeon in Australia and New Zealand on August 29, 2015, and on Nickelodeon in the United Kingdom and Ireland on September 28, 2015. The series premiered on YTV in Canada on October 8, 2015.

Ratings 
 
}}

References

External links 
 

2010s American children's comedy television series
2010s American school television series
2010s Nickelodeon original programming
2014 American television series debuts
2016 American television series endings
English-language television shows
Middle school television series
Television series created by Scott Fellows